São Bento is a metro station on São Paulo Metro Line 1-Blue, located in the district of Sé, in São Paulo. The station was opened on 26 September 1975. It will be connected, in the future, according to the State Secretariat of Metropolitan Transports of São Paulo, with Line 19-Sky Blue (Anhangabaú↔Bosque Maia).

Characteristics
Buried station with connection mezzanine, two split platforms and structure in apparent concrete.

Station average demand
The average entrance of passengers in the station is of 73,000 passengers per day, according to Metro data. It is situated in a very crowded region, in Rua Boa Vista, and close to the region of Rua 25 de Março, besides being located next to SPTrans Correio Bus Terminal.

References

São Paulo Metro stations
Railway stations located underground in Brazil